Emirler is a  village in Yenişehir district, which is an intracity district within Greater Mersin, Turkey. The population of the village was 631
as of 2012.  There are other villages named Emirler in both Tarsus and in Niğde and according to tradition these villages were founded by three brothers.

References